Ada Maria Katherine Hanbury-Tracy, Baroness Sudeley (née Tollemache; 21 June 1848 – 6 January 1928) was a British author.

Life
She was born in 1848. She was the only daughter of Isabella and Frederick Tollemache and niece of Lionel Tollemache, 8th Earl of Dysart.

In 1868 she married Charles Hanbury-Tracy, 4th Baron Sudeley in the Chapel at Ham House. He served in the House of Lords and was a fellow of the Royal Society.

In 1890 she published her book Ham House, Belonging to the Earl of Dysart.

Her husband was bankrupt by 1893 and they had to sell Toddington Manor. Her husband died in 1922 and their eldest son William inherited the title - she died in 1928.

References

External links 
 

1848 births
1928 deaths
British women non-fiction writers
British baronesses
Tollemache family
19th-century British non-fiction writers
19th-century British women writers